BMC Public Health is a peer-reviewed open-access scientific journal that covers epidemiology of disease and various aspects of public health. The journal was established in 2001 and is published by BioMed Central.

Abstracting and indexing 
The journal is abstracted and indexed:
 Chemical Abstracts Service
 EBSCO databases
 ProQuest
 Scopus
 Science Citation Index Expanded

According to the Journal Citation Reports, the journal has a 2021 impact factor of 4.545.

References

External links 

 

English-language journals
BioMed Central academic journals
Public health journals
Publications established in 2001